Henry Attfield (1756 – c. 1829) was an English cricketer who made his first known appearance in the 1773 season.  Aged 17 at the time, he must have been a genuine 1773 debutant.  He was a native of Bagshot in Surrey.

He played frequently for Surrey but was still only 26 when his career ended in 1782.

He seems to have been known as "Field" and this often appeared on old scorecards.

References
 Fresh Light on 18th Century Cricket by G B Buckley (FL18)
 The Dawn of Cricket by H T Waghorn (WDC)
 Scores & Biographies, Volume 1 by Arthur Haygarth (SBnnn)
 The Glory Days of Cricket by Ashley Mote (GDC)
 John Nyren's "The Cricketers of my Time" by Ashley Mote

English cricketers
Surrey cricketers
English cricketers of 1701 to 1786
1756 births
1829 deaths
Hampshire cricketers
English cricketers of 1787 to 1825
Chertsey cricketers